The Battle of Marion (December 17–18, 1864) was a military engagement fought between units of the Union Army and the Confederate Army during the American Civil War near the town of Marion, Virginia. The battle was part of Union Maj. Gen. George Stoneman's attack upon southwest Virginia, aimed at destroying Confederate industrial infrastructure near Saltville and Marion.  Union Cavalry and Infantry regiments—some 4,500 soldiers in total—left Tennessee on December 17 for southwestern Virginia.

Through two days of fighting, a Confederate force under the command of John C. Breckinridge—totalling 1,200–1,500 infantry and cavalry—was successful in holding defensive positions in and around the town of Marion.  On the first day, successive Union attacks were defeated by a well-coordinated Confederate defenses near a covered bridge outside of Marion.  By the end of the second day, dwindling ammunition supplies forced Confederate forces to withdraw from the area.  With casualties for both sides approaching 300, Union forces proceeded to destroy the salt mines, lead works, and other beneficial Confederate infrastructure in Marion and Saltville.

Background
By 1864, the American Civil War was slowly drawing to a close.  With Abraham Lincoln re-elected as President of the Union, and Gen. Ulysses Grant made commander of the Union Army, the possibility of a Confederate victory was steadily lessened. Along the Eastern Seaboard, Union forces pushed the Confederate forces of Gen. Robert E. Lee steadily back in successive Union victories at Wilderness and Spotsylvania.  In the Appalachian mountains, Phillip Sheridan had defeated Confederate armies in the Shenandoah Valley.  As Union forces pushed southward, they destroyed significant portions of the Confederate agriculture base.  As Union forces defeated Confederate armies in the northern reaches of the CSA, Gen. William T. Sherman began his march to the sea, which would eventually succeed in destroying 20% of the agricultural production in Georgia.

As Union forces advanced south, the infrastructure near the town of Marion—located in Southwest Virginia on the Middle Fork of the Holston River, between Saltville and Wytheville—became a major objective of Union forces. Marion itself was politically divided, with citizens fighting for the Union and the Confederacy. Until the winter of 1864, the town's location in a mountainous region had protected it from major fighting. In November 1864, George Stoneman—deputy commander of the Department of the Ohio and in charge of all Union cavalry units in eastern Tennessee—proposed an expedition into southwest Virginia to disrupt the production of supplies and facilities beneficial to the Confederacy. This gained the approval of Maj. Gen. John Schofield on December 6, 1864.

Troops
The Union forces consisted of about 4,500 men from a variety of different units, including several units which had participated in smaller-scale raids into Southwest Virginia earlier in the conflict. The Union army was under the command of Maj. Gen. George Stoneman, Brig. Gen. Alvan Gillem, and Brig. Gen. Stephen Burbridge.  The majority of the forces that would have been stationed at Marion had been transferred to the Army of Northern Virginia.  The heavily scaled-down Confederate forces consisted of approximately 1,500 men, under the overall command of Maj. Gen. John C. Breckinridge and Brig. Gen. Basil Duke.

Union Forces
Stoneman used troops under Brig. Gens. Alvan Gillem and Stephen Burbridge, including the 5th and the 6th U.S. Colored Cavalry Regiments—both of which had participated in the previous attempt to destroy the salt works during the First Battle of Saltville. Stoneman ordered Burbridge to bring his division of 4,200 cavalrymen through the Cumberland Gap to join Stoneman and Gillem at Knoxville, Tennessee, where Gillem was refitting his own command into a picked force of 1,500 men. Stoneman did not reveal the objectives of the expedition to his subordinates until three days after they had departed Knoxville on December 10. On December 12, Stoneman's force flanked and forced back Confederate Brig. Gen. Basil W. Duke's cavalry at Rogersville, Tennessee. Union forces defeated and scattered Confederate troops the next day at Kingsport, Tennessee. There Gillem captured 84 prisoners, including Col. Richard C. Morgan and the brigade's supply train.

On December 14, the Union regiments began to push Duke's cavalry back toward Abingdon, Virginia. On December 16, Stoneman's cavalry advanced towards Marion, destroying infrastructure and public buildings in their path.

Confederate Forces
The Confederate forces were under command of Maj. Gen. John C. Breckinridge—former Vice-President of the United States, and also candidate for U.S. President in 1860—the commander of the Department of Southwest Virginia. His command consisted of approximately 1,000 regular troops with another 500 militia in reserve. Most of the companies had been transferred to the Army of Northern Virginia to help in the defense of Richmond. Breckinridge's forces consisted of Colonel Henry Giltner's brigade—formed from the soldiers of the 4th Kentucky Cavalry and the 10th Kentucky Cavalry Battalions—the 11th Kentucky Mounted Rifles—later renamed the 13th Kentucky Cavalry Battalion—and the 64th Virginia Mounted Infantry. It also included Basil Duke's cavalry, Brig. Gen. George Cosby's cavalry, and Col. Vincent Witcher's 34th Battalion of Virginia Cavalry.

On the night of December 18, Breckinridge and his troops moved out of Saltville, Virginia, in an effort to stem Stoneman's advance. Taking the regular troops with him, Breckinridge left Col. Robert Preston in charge of the 500 militia men to defend the salt works. Breckinridge sent Witcher and his men of the 34th on ahead of the main force and ordered them to harass the Union forces. At about 3 a.m., Breckinridge and his small company began to cross Walkers Mountain. In the last few days before the march,  of rain had fallen, leaving the roads muddy and travel difficult. By about 4 a.m., they reached the main road near Seven Mile Ford, Virginia where Breckinridge halted to wait for daylight before continuing.

Battle

Advance

Around noon of December 17, 1864, Breckinridge's men mounted their horses and rode towards Marion. Meanwhile, Stoneman sent some of his Tennessee regiments to Wytheville to destroy anything that looked valuable.

Stoneman and Burbridge continued on toward Marion where they encountered Witcher and his men. Burbridge's front regiment easily pushed back Witcher's small regiment, who stopped just so they could fire a volley into the Union cavalry. They then continued to retreat toward Marion. Witcher sent a courier to inform Breckinridge that they were coming to join them at Marion.

First day

Breckinridge's front regiment was the 10th Kentucky Mounted Rifles, under the command of Col. Benjamin Caudill. Caudill's men dismounted and fired into the Union cavalry, inflicting minor casualties. As the rest of Breckinridge's troops began to arrive on the scene, Stoneman's soldiers secured elevated positions overlooking the river. Breckinridge observed that these hills were the best defensive positions in the area, ordering his front regiments to eliminate Union resistance on the hills. The rest of Giltner's Brigade also joined in the charge, routing the Union soldiers and allowing the Confederate forces to use the defensive positions themselves.

Upon losing the heightened positions, Burbridge ordered his own forces to counterattack the Confederate positions.  When the Union regiments advanced on the hills, Confederate infantry and cavalry inflicted heavy casualties, slowing Burbridge's progress. As Union forces continued to attack the hill, Maj. Richard Page—commander of the Confederate artillery squadrons at Marion—fired his battery of 10-pounder Parrott rifles, in an attempt to slow the Union charge.  Taking heavy casualties, and facing heavy fire from all sides, Burbridge's front regiments withdrew.

The Union officers, refusing to withdraw, reorganized their regiments and resumed the attack.  As with the previous charge, the Confederate line held, repelling what remained of the Union regiments.  After repelling a final charge, Confederate forces had succeeded in holding their elevated positions throughout the first day of combat.  Throughout the night, Breckinridge ordered his forces to move forward and construct new barricades to receive the next day's attacks.  These new positions placed the opposing armies within  of one another.  In the lull between the fighting, elements of the Union forces were ordered to take up positions at a covered bridge on the river.  With 75 men advancing to positions near the bridge, both sides prepared to resume combat the following day.

Second day
At dawn, Union forces positioned at the covered bridge opened fire, harassing the Confederate forward positions.  As the morning's fog lifted, Burbridge's regiments attacked.  Columns of Union soldiers moved across the fields, subjected to heavy defensive fire from Breckinridge's Confederate forces.  As the day progressed, a combination of Union regiments succeeded in pushing back the 4th Kentucky Infantry Regiment.  Confederate counterattacks, however, succeeded in recapturing the breastwork positions.

As the counterattack progressed, Union forces at the covered bridge took increasing pressure from the 4th Kentucky Regiment.  Realizing that the location was unprotected, the remaining Union forces attempted to withdraw to the starting lines. Confederate forces—now stationed near the covered bridge—exacted heavy casualties on retreating forces. The few Union soldiers who remained at the bridge—now caught between multiple Confederate regiments—refrained from attacking.  When Union forces attempted to break through to the bridge, Confederate forces inflicted further casualties, forcing the attack to withdraw.

On the far right, Duke was pressed hard by columns of attacking Union soldiers. Seeing this, Col. Giltner sent his regiment to reinforce Duke. Before Giltner's reinforcements arrived, Duke and his men counterattacked the Union line—routing it and forcing a withdrawal. Duke and Witcher then combined forces and charged the Union's extreme left flank, inflicting significant damage on a Union colored regiment.

Having taken heavy casualties and losing strategic superiority, Burbridge and his men conducted a disorganized withdrawal. The Confederates had succeeded in holding the rail breastworks, yet had expended most of their ammunition in doing so. Each Confederate infantryman had fired at least seventy-five rounds, with some firing significantly more. The Union commanders then ordered another charge with a cavalry regiment that reinforced the Union infantry. The unexpected fighting capabilities of the small Confederate force had temporarily created a reprieve for the salt works.

Aftermath and significance
Breckinridge ordered his field officers to inspect the troops and to report back with the condition of his troops. The number of men wounded and killed had depleted his troops to a point that he judged that he could no longer hold back the Union forces at his front lines. Ammunition in the camp was also dwindling; each man had no more than ten cartridges apiece. With their supplies destroyed by Stoneman's troops at the towns of Wytheville and Abingdon, there was little hope of being resupplied or reinforced in the near future.

Although the vastly outnumbered Confederates had inflicted casualties and slowed the Union advance on Saltville, they were incapable of halting it. Finding their own path to Saltville's defenses blocked, Breckinridge and his men retreated further south, while a Union company advanced. Saltville fell to a night attack on December 20–21 and the salt works were destroyed by the Union forces.

Salt had always been in short supply in Virginia and after the destruction of the salt-mines became "practically nonexistent", giving Lee's sutlers "no means of preserving what little meat they could lay hands on ... for the hungry men in the trenches outside Petersburg and Richmond". Additionally, damage to the lead mines near Wytheville would keep them from contributing fully to the war effort for three months.  Many wells and water sources were also fouled, leading to the disruption of water supplies. Many of the railroad locomotives, cars, depots, and bridges in the vicinity were destroyed beyond repair during Stoneman's campaign. In a memoir, Stoneman wrote that his troops captured 34 officers and 845 enlisted men during the attack into Marion, Virginia.

Notes

References

 
 
 
 
 
 
 
 Official Records 
 
 
 CWSAC Report Update

External links
 Virginia Civil War Trails description of the battle
 History of Marion County
 Step by step of the battle

Marion
Marion
Marion
Marion
Marion
Smyth County, Virginia
Marion
1864 in Virginia
December 1864 events